The Kandahar Five is a term used to refer to five men who had been held, for years, in a Taliban prison in Kandahar, Afghanistan, only to end up in extrajudicial detention in the United States Guantanamo Bay detention camps, in Cuba.

Several of the men were interviewed by international reporters during a brief period of partial freedom when they were held in a refugee camp following the liberation of the prison by Northern Alliance forces, who freed 1500 men. They men say they ended up being traded or sold to the Americans in return for a bounty.

According to the Associated Press, in June 2007 Commander Jeffrey Gordon, a Department of Defense spokesman defended some of the men's continued detention:

References

Lists of Guantanamo Bay detainees
Extrajudicial prisoners of the United States
Prisoners of the Taliban
Quantified groups of defendants